Rexiella is a lichen genus in the family Cladoniaceae. The genus, originally circumscribed with the name Rexia by authors Soili Stenroos, Raquel Pino-Bodas, and Teuvo Ahti in 2018, was created to contain the species Cladonia sullivanii, first formally described in 1882 by Swiss botanist Johannes Müller Argoviensis. After publication of the new genus, it was discovered that the name was illegitimate, because an earlier homonym had been published; the generic name Rexia  had already been created in 2006 to contain the cyanobacterial species Rexia erecta. The new name Rexiella was therefore proposed in 2019. This name honours the Australian lichenologist Rex Filson, who published monographs on the genera Cladia and Heterodea.

Rexiella differs from Cladia by the presence of thick pseudopodetia with black to white, tightly packed, and loosely woven medulla. The genus produces the secondary compounds usnic acid and divaricatic acid. Rexiella sullivanii is found in Australia, New Zealand, and South America.

References

Cladoniaceae
Monotypic Lecanorales genera
Taxa described in 2019
Taxa named by Teuvo Ahti
Lichen genera